An emoji (plural emoji or emojis) is a pictogram, logogram, ideogram or smiley embedded in text and used in electronic messages and web pages. The primary function of emoji is to fill in emotional cues otherwise missing from typed conversation. Examples of emoji are 😂, 😃, 🧘🏻‍♂️, 🌍, 🌦️, 🥖, 🚗, 📱, 🎉, ❤️, ✅, and 🏁. Emoji exist in various genres, including facial expressions, common objects, places and types of weather, and animals. They are much like emoticons, except emoji are pictures rather than typographic approximations; the term "emoji" in the strict sense refers to such pictures which can be represented as encoded characters, but it is sometimes applied to messaging stickers by extension. Originally meaning pictograph, the word emoji comes from Japanese  + ; the resemblance to the English words emotion and emoticon is purely coincidental. The ISO 15924 script code for emoji is Zsye.

Originating on Japanese mobile phones in 1997, emoji became increasingly popular worldwide in the 2010s after being added to several mobile operating systems. They are now considered to be a large part of popular culture in the West and around the world. In 2015, Oxford Dictionaries named the Face with Tears of Joy emoji (😂) the word of the year.

History

Evolution from emoticons (1990s)

The emoji was predated by the emoticon, a concept implemented in 1982 by computer scientist Scott Fahlman when he suggested text-based symbols such as :-) and :-( could be used to replace language. Theories about language replacement can be traced back to the 1960s, when Russian novelist and professor Vladimir Nabokov stated in an interview with The New York Times: "I often think there should exist a special typographical sign for a smile — some sort of concave mark, a supine round bracket." It did not become a mainstream concept until the 1990s when Japanese, American and European companies began developing Fahlman's idea. Mary Kalantzis and Bill Cope point out that similar symbology was incorporated by Bruce Parello, a student at the University of Illinois, into PLATO IV, the first e-learning system, in 1972. The PLATO system was not considered mainstream, and therefore Parello's pictograms were only used by a small number of people. Scott Fahlman's emoticons importantly used common alphabet symbols, and aimed to replace language/text to express emotion, and for that reason are seen as the actual origin of emoticons.

Wingdings, a font invented by Charles Bigelow and Kris Holmes, was released by Microsoft in 1990. It could be used to send pictographs in rich text messages, but would only load on devices with the Wingdings font installed. In 1995, the French newspaper Le Monde announced that Alcatel would be launching a new phone, the BC 600. Its welcome screen displayed a digital smiley face, replacing the usual text seen as part of the "welcome message" often seen on other devices at the time. In 1997, J-Phone launched the SkyWalker DP-211SW, which contained a set of 90 emoji. It is thought to be the first set of its kind. Its designs, each measuring 12 by 12 pixels were monochrome, depicting numbers, sports, the time, moon phases and the weather. It contained the Pile of Poo emoji in particular. The J-Phone model experienced low sales, and the emoji set was thus rarely used.

In 1999, Shigetaka Kurita created 176 emoji as part of NTT DoCoMo's i-mode, used on its mobile platform. They were intended to help facilitate electronic communication, and to serve as a distinguishing feature from other services. Due to their influence, Kurita's designs were once claimed to be the first cellular emoji; however, Kurita has denied that this is the case. According to interviews, he took inspiration from Japanese manga where characters are often drawn with symbolic representations called manpu (such as a water drop on a face representing nervousness or confusion), and weather pictograms used to depict the weather conditions at any given time. He also drew inspiration from Chinese characters and street sign pictograms. The DoCoMo i-Mode set included facial expressions, such as smiley faces, derived from a Japanese visual style commonly found in manga and anime, combined with kaomoji and smiley elements. Kurita's work is displayed in the Museum of Modern Art in New York City.

Kurita's emoji were brightly colored, albeit with a single color per glyph. General-use emoji, such as sports, actions and weather, can readily be traced back to Kurita's emoji set. Notably absent from the set were pictograms that demonstrated emotion. The yellow-faced emoji in current use evolved from other emoticon sets and cannot be traced back to Kurita's work. His set also had generic images much like the J-Phones. Elsewhere in the 1990s, Nokia phones began including preset pictograms in its text messaging app, which they defined as "smileys and symbols". A third notable emoji set was introduced by Japanese mobile phone brand au by KDDI.

Development of emoji sets (2000–2007)
The basic 12-by-12-pixel emoji in Japan grew in popularity across various platforms over the next decade. This was aided by the popularity of DoCoMo i-mode, which for many was the origins of the smartphone. The i-mode service also saw the introduction of emoji in conversation form on messenger apps. By 2004, i-mode had 40 million subscribers, exposing numerous people to emoji for the first time between 2000 and 2004. The popularity of i-mode led to other manufacturers offering their own emoji sets. While emoji adoption was high in Japan during this time, the competitors failed to collaborate to create a uniform set of emoji to be used across all platforms in the country.

The Universal Coded Character Set (Unicode), controlled by the Unicode Consortium and ISO/IEC JTC 1/SC 2, had already been established as the international standard for text representation (ISO/IEC 10646) since 1993, although variants of Shift JIS remained relatively common in Japan. Unicode included several characters which would subsequently be classified as emoji, including some from North American or Western European sources such as DOS code page 437, ITC Zapf Dingbats or the WordPerfect Iconic Symbols set. Unicode coverage of written characters was extended several times by new editions during the 2000s, with little interest in incorporating the Japanese cellular emoji sets (deemed out of scope), although symbol characters which would subsequently be classified as emoji continued to be added. For example, Unicode 4.0 contained 16 new emoji, which included direction arrows, a warning triangle, and an eject button. Besides Zapf Dingbats, other dingbat fonts such as Wingdings or Webdings also included additional pictographic symbols in their own custom pi font encodings; unlike Zapf Dingbats, however, many of these would not be available as Unicode emoji until 2014.

The Smiley Company developed The Smiley Dictionary, which was launched in 2001. The desktop platform was aimed at allowing people to insert smileys as text when sending emails and writing on a desktop computer. The smiley toolbar offered a variety of symbols and smileys and was used on platforms such as MSN Messenger. Nokia, then one of the largest global telecom companies, was still referring to today's emoji sets as smileys in 2001. The digital smiley movement was headed up by Nicolas Loufrani, the CEO of The Smiley Company. He created a smiley toolbar, which was available at smileydictionary.com during the early 2000s to be sent as emoji are today.

Beginnings of Unicode emoji (2008–2014)
Mobile providers in both the United States and Europe began discussions on how to introduce their own emoji sets from 2004 onwards. Many companies did not begin to take emoji seriously until Google employees requested that Unicode look into the possibility of a uniform emoji set. Apple quickly followed and began to collaborate with not only Google, but also providers in Europe and Japan. In August 2007, Mark Davis and his colleagues Kat Momoi and Markus Scherer wrote the first draft for consideration by the Unicode Technical Committee (UTC), to introduce emoji into the Unicode standard. The UTC, having previously deemed emoji to be out of scope for Unicode, made the decision to broaden its scope to enable compatibility with the Japanese cellular carrier formats which were becoming more widespread. Peter Edberg and Yasuo Kida joined the collaborative effort from Apple Inc. shortly after, and their official UTC proposal came in January 2009.

Pending the assignment of standard Unicode code points, Google and Apple implemented emoji support via Private Use Area schemes. Google first introduced emoji in Gmail in October 2008, in collaboration with au by KDDI, and Apple introduced the first release of Apple Color Emoji to iPhone OS on 21 November 2008. Initially, Apple's emoji support was implemented for holders of a SoftBank SIM card; the emoji themselves were represented using SoftBank's Private Use Area scheme and mostly resembled the SoftBank designs. Gmail emoji used their own Private Use Area scheme, in a supplementary Private Use plane.

Separately, a proposal had been submitted in 2008 to add the ARIB extended characters used in broadcasting in Japan to Unicode. This included several pictographic symbols. These were added in Unicode 5.2 in 2009, a year before the cellular emoji sets were fully added; they include several characters which either also appeared amongst the cellular emoji or were subsequently classified as emoji.

After iPhone users in the United States discovered that downloading Japanese apps allowed access to the keyboard, pressure grew to expand the availability of the emoji keyboard beyond Japan. The Emoji application for iOS, which altered the Settings app to allow access to the emoji keyboard, was created by Josh Gare in February 2010. Before the existence of Gare's Emoji app, Apple had intended for the emoji keyboard to only be available in Japan in iOS version 2.2.

Throughout 2009, members of the Unicode Consortium and national standardization bodies of various countries gave feedback and proposed changes to the international standardization of the emoji. The feedback from various bodies in the United States, Europe, and Japan agreed on a set of 722 emoji as the standard set. This would be released in October 2010 in Unicode 6.0. Apple made the emoji keyboard available to those outside of Japan in iOS version 5.0 in 2011. Later, Unicode 7.0 (June 2014) added the character repertoires of the Webdings and Wingdings fonts to Unicode, resulting in approximately 250 more Unicode emoji.

The Unicode emoji whose code points were assigned in 2014 or earlier are therefore taken from several sources. A single character could exist in multiple sources, and characters from a source were unified with existing characters where appropriate: for example, the "shower" weather symbol (☔️) from the ARIB source was unified with an existing umbrella with raindrops character, which had been added for KPS 9566 compatibility. The emoji characters named  from all three Japanese carriers were in turn unified with the ARIB character. However, the Unicode Consortium groups the most significant sources of emoji into four categories:

UTS #51 and modern emoji (2015–present)

In late 2014, a Public Review Issue was created by the Unicode Technical Committee, seeking feedback on a proposed Unicode Technical Report (UTR) titled "Unicode Emoji". This was intended to improve interoperability of emoji between vendors, and define a means of supporting multiple skin tones. The feedback period closed in January 2015. Also in January 2015, the use of the zero width joiner to indicate that a sequence of emoji could be shown as a single equivalent glyph (analogous to a ligature) as a means of implementing emoji without atomic code points, such as varied compositions of families, was discussed within the "emoji ad-hoc committee".

Unicode 8.0 (June 2015) added another 41 emoji, including articles of sports equipment such as the cricket bat, food items such as the taco, new facial expressions, and symbols for places of worship, as well as five characters (crab, scorpion, lion face, bow and arrow, amphora) to improve support for pictorial rather than symbolic representations of the signs of the Zodiac.

Also in June 2015, the first approved version ("Emoji 1.0") of the Unicode Emoji report was published as Unicode Technical Report #51 (UTR #51). This introduced the mechanism of skin tone indicators, the first official recommendations about which Unicode characters were to be considered emoji, and the first official recommendations about which characters were to be displayed in an emoji font in absence of a variation selector, and listed the zero width joiner sequences for families and couples that were implemented by existing vendors. Maintenance of UTR #51, taking emoji requests, and creating proposals for emoji characters and emoji mechanisms was made the responsibility of the Unicode Emoji Subcommittee (ESC), operating as a subcommittee of the Unicode Technical Committee,

With the release of version 5.0 in May 2017 alongside Unicode 10.0, UTR #51 was redesignated a Unicode Technical Standard (UTS #51), making it an independent specification rather than merely an informative document.  there were 2,666 Unicode emoji listed. The next version of UTS #51 (published in May 2018) skipped to the version number Emoji 11.0, so as to synchronise its major version number with the corresponding version of the Unicode Standard.

The popularity of emoji has caused pressure from vendors and international markets to add additional designs into the Unicode standard to meet the demands of different cultures. Some characters now defined as emoji are inherited from a variety of pre-Unicode messenger systems not only used in Japan, including Yahoo and MSN Messenger.

Corporate demand for emoji standardization has placed pressures on the Unicode Consortium, with some members complaining that it had overtaken the group's traditional focus on standardizing characters used for minority languages and transcribing historical records. Conversely, the Consortium recognises that public desire for emoji support has put pressure on vendors to improve their Unicode support, which is especially true for characters outside the Basic Multilingual Plane, thus leading to better support for Unicode's historic and minority scripts in deployed software.

Cultural influence

Oxford Dictionaries named  its 2015 Word of the Year. Oxford noted that 2015 had seen a sizable increase in the use of the word "emoji" and recognized its impact on popular culture. Oxford Dictionaries President Caspar Grathwohl expressed that "traditional alphabet scripts have been struggling to meet the rapid-fire, visually focused demands of 21st Century communication. It's not surprising that a pictographic script like emoji has stepped in to fill those gaps—it's flexible, immediate, and infuses tone beautifully." SwiftKey found that "Face with Tears of Joy" was the most popular emoji across the world. The American Dialect Society declared  to be the "Most Notable Emoji" of 2015 in their Word of the Year vote.

Some emoji are specific to Japanese culture, such as a bowing businessman, the shoshinsha mark used to indicate a beginner driver, a white flower used to denote "brilliant homework", or a group of emoji representing popular foods: ramen noodles, dango, onigiri, curry, and sushi. Unicode Consortium founder Mark Davis compared the use of emoji to a developing language, particularly mentioning the American use of eggplant to represent a phallus. Some linguists have classified emoji and emoticons as discourse markers.

In December 2015 a sentiment analysis of emoji was published, and the Emoji Sentiment Ranking 1.0 was provided. In 2016, a musical about emoji premiered in Los Angeles.  The computer-animated The Emoji Movie was released in summer 2017.

In January 2017, in what is believed to be the first large-scale study of emoji usage, researchers at the University of Michigan analyzed over 1.2 billion messages input via the Kika Emoji Keyboard and announced that the Face With Tears of Joy was the most popular emoji. The Heart and the Heart eyes emoji stood second and third, respectively. The study also found that the French use heart emoji the most. People in countries like Australia, France, and the Czech Republic used more happy emoji, while this was not so for people in Mexico, Colombia, Chile, and Argentina, where people used more negative emoji in comparison to cultural hubs known for restraint and self-discipline, like Turkey, France and Russia.

There has been discussion among legal experts on whether or not emoji could be admissible as evidence in court trials. Furthermore, as emoji continue to develop and grow as a "language" of symbols, there may also be the potential of the formation of emoji "dialects". Emoji are being used as more than just to show reactions and emotions. Snapchat has even incorporated emoji in its trophy and friends system with each emoji showing a complex meaning. Emojis can also convey different meanings based on syntax and inversion. For instance, 'fairy comments' involve heart, star, and fairy emojis placed between the words of a sentence. These comments often invert the meanings associated with hearts and may be used to 'tread on borders of offense.'

In 2017, the MIT Media Lab published DeepMoji, a deep neural network sentiment analysis algorithm that was trained on 1.2 billion emoji occurrences in Twitter data from 2013 to 2017. DeepMoji was found to outperform human subjects in correctly identifying sarcasm in Tweets and other online modes of communication.

Use in furthering causes

On March 5, 2019, a drop of blood emoji was released, which is intended to help break the stigma of menstruation. In addition to normalizing periods, it will also be relevant to describe medical topics such as donating blood and other blood-related activities.

A mosquito emoji was added in 2018 to raise awareness for diseases spread by the insect, such as dengue and malaria.

Linguistic function of emojis 
Linguistically, emoji are used to indicate emotional state, they tend to be used more in positive communication. Some researchers believe emoji can be used for visual rhetoric.  Emoji can be used to set emotional tone in messages. Emoji tend not to have their own meaning but act as a paralanguage adding meaning to text. Emoji can add clarity and credibility to text.

Sociolinguistically, the use of emoji differ depending on speaker and setting. Women use emoji more than men. Men use a wider variety of emoji. Women are more likely to use emoji in public communication than private communication. Extraversion and agreeableness are positively correlated with emoji use, neuroticism is negative correlated. Emoji use differ between cultures: studies in terms of Hofstede's cultural dimensions theory found that cultures with high power distance and tolerance to indulgence used more negative emojis, while those with high uncertainty avoidance, individualism, and long-term orientation use more positive emojis.

Emoji communication problems
Research has shown that emoji are often misunderstood. In some cases, this misunderstanding is related to how the actual emoji design is interpreted by the viewer; in other cases, the emoji that was sent is not shown in the same way on the receiving side.

The first issue relates to the cultural or contextual interpretation of the emoji. When the author picks an emoji, they think about it in a certain way, but the same character may not trigger the same thoughts in the mind of the receiver (see also Models of communication).

For example, people in China have developed a system for using emoji subversively, so that a smiley face could be sent to convey a despising, mocking, and even obnoxious attitude, as the orbicularis oculi (the muscle near that upper eye corner) on the face of the emoji does not move, and the orbicularis oris (the one near the mouth) tightens, which is believed to be a sign of suppressing a smile.

The second problem relates to technology and branding. When an author of a message picks an emoji from a list, it is normally encoded in a non-graphical manner during the transmission, and if the author and the reader do not use the same software or operating system for their devices, the reader's device may visualize the same emoji in a different way. Small changes to a character's look may completely alter its perceived meaning with the receiver. As an example, in April 2020, British actress and presenter Jameela Jamil posted a tweet from her iPhone using the Face with Hand Over Mouth emoji (🤭) as part of a comment on people shopping for food during the COVID-19 pandemic. On Apple's iOS, the emoji expression is neutral and pensive, but on other platforms the emoji shows as a giggling face. Many fans were initially upset thinking that she, as a well off celebrity, was mocking poor people, but this was not her intended meaning.

Researchers from German Studies Institute at Ruhr-Universität Bochum found that most people can easily understand an emoji when it replaces a word directly – like an icon for a rose instead of the word 'rose' – yet it takes people about 50 percent longer to comprehend the emoji.

Variation and ambiguity
Emoji characters vary slightly between platforms within the limits in meaning defined by the Unicode specification, as companies have tried to provide artistic presentations of ideas and objects. For example, following an Apple tradition, the calendar emoji on Apple products always shows July 17, the date in 2002 Apple announced its iCal calendar application for macOS. This led some Apple product users to initially nickname July 17 "World Emoji Day". Other emoji fonts show different dates or do not show a specific one.

Some Apple emoji are very similar to the SoftBank standard, since SoftBank was the first Japanese network on which the iPhone launched. For example,  is female on Apple and SoftBank standards but male or gender-neutral on others.

Journalists have noted that the ambiguity of emoji has allowed them to take on culture-specific meanings not present in the original glyphs. For example,  has been described as being used in English-language communities to signify "non-caring fabulousness" and "anything from shutting haters down to a sense of accomplishment". Unicode manuals sometimes provide notes on auxiliary meanings of an object to guide designers on how emoji may be used, for example noting that some users may expect  to stand for "a reserved or ticketed seat, as for an airplane, train, or theater".

Controversial emoji

Some emoji have been involved in controversy due to their perceived meanings. Multiple arrests and imprisonments have followed usage of pistol, knife, and bomb emoji in ways that authorities deemed credible threats.

In the lead-up to the 2016 Summer Olympics, the Unicode Consortium considered proposals to add several Olympic-related emoji, including medals and events such as handball and water polo. By October 2015, these candidate emoji included "rifle" and "modern pentathlon". However, in 2016, Apple and Microsoft opposed these two emoji, and the characters were added without emoji presentations, meaning that software is expected to render them in black-and-white rather than color, and emoji-specific software such as onscreen keyboards will generally not include them. In addition, while the original incarnations of the modern pentathlon emoji depicted its five events, including a man pointing a gun, the final glyph contains a person riding a horse, along with a laser pistol target in the corner.

On August 1, 2016, Apple announced that in iOS 10, the pistol emoji would be changed from a realistic revolver to a water pistol. Conversely, the following day, Microsoft pushed out an update to Windows 10 that changed its longstanding depiction of the pistol emoji as a toy ray-gun to a real revolver. Microsoft stated that the change was made to bring the glyph more in line with industry-standard designs and customer expectations. By 2018, most major platforms such as Google, Microsoft, Samsung, Facebook, and Twitter had transitioned their rendering of the pistol emoji to match Apple's water gun implementation. Apple's change of depiction from a realistic gun to a toy gun was criticised by, among others, the editor of Emojipedia, because it could lead to messages appearing differently to the receiver than the sender had intended. Insider Rob Price said it created the potential for "serious miscommunication across different platforms", and asked "What if a joke sent from an Apple user to a Google user is misconstrued because of differences in rendering? Or if a genuine threat sent by a Google user to an Apple user goes unreported because it is taken as a joke?"

The eggplant (aubergine) emoji has also seen controversy due to it being used to represent a penis. Beginning in December 2014, the hashtag  began to rise to popularity on Instagram for use in marking photos featuring clothed or unclothed penises.

The peach emoji has likewise been used as a euphemistic icon for buttocks, with a 2016 Emojipedia analysis revealing that only seven percent of English language tweets with the peach emoji refer to the actual fruit. In 2016, Apple attempted to redesign the emoji to less resemble buttocks. This was met with fierce backlash in beta testing, and Apple reversed its decision by the time it went live to the public.

In December 2017, a lawyer in Delhi, India, threatened to file a lawsuit against WhatsApp for allowing use of the middle finger emoji on the basis that the company is "directly abetting the use of an offensive, lewd, obscene gesture" in violation of the Indian Penal Code.

Emoji implementation

Early implementation in Japan
Various, often incompatible, character encoding schemes were developed by the different mobile providers in Japan for their own emoji sets. For example, the extended Shift JIS representation F797 is used for a convenience store (🏪) by SoftBank, but for a wristwatch (⌚️) by KDDI. All three vendors also developed schemes for encoding their emoji in the Unicode Private Use Area: DoCoMo, for example, used the range U+E63E through U+E757. Versions of iOS prior to 5.1 encoded emoji in the SoftBank private use area.

Unicode support considerations
Most, but not all, emoji are included in the Supplementary Multilingual Plane (SMP) of Unicode, which is also used for ancient scripts, some modern scripts such as Adlam or Osage, and special-use characters such as Mathematical Alphanumeric Symbols. Some systems introduced prior to the advent of Unicode emoji were only designed to support characters in the Basic Multilingual Plane (BMP), on the assumption that non-BMP characters would rarely be encountered, although failure to properly handle characters outside of the BMP precludes Unicode compliance.

The introduction of Unicode emoji created an incentive for vendors to improve their support for non-BMP characters. The Unicode Consortium notes that "[b]ecause of the demand for emoji, many implementations have upgraded their Unicode support substantially", also helping support for minority languages that use those features.

Color support
Any operating system that supports adding additional fonts to the system can add an emoji-supporting font. However, inclusion of colorful emoji in existing font formats requires dedicated support for color glyphs. Not all operating systems have support for color fonts, so in these cases emoji might have to be rendered as black-and-white line art or not at all. There are four different formats used for multi-color glyphs in an SFNT font, not all of which are necessarily supported by a given operating system library or software package such as a web browser or graphical program. This means that color fonts may need to be supplied in several formats to be usable on multiple operating systems, or in multiple applications.

Implementation by different platforms and vendors
Apple first introduced emoji to their desktop operating system with the release of OS X 10.7 Lion, in 2011. Users can view emoji characters sent through email and messaging applications, which are commonly shared by mobile users, as well as any other application. Users can create emoji symbols using the "Characters" special input panel from almost any native application by selecting the "Edit" menu and pulling down to "Special Characters", or by the key combination . The emoji keyboard was first available in Japan with the release of iPhone OS version 2.2 in 2008. The emoji keyboard was not officially made available outside of Japan until iOS version 5.0. From iPhone OS 2.2 through to iOS 4.3.5 (2011), those outside Japan could access the keyboard but had to use a third-party app to enable it. Apple has revealed that the "face with tears of joy" is the most popular emoji among English speaking Americans. On second place is the "heart" emoji followed by the "Loudly Crying Face".

An update for Windows 7 and Windows Server 2008 R2 brought a subset of the monochrome Unicode set to those operating systems as part of the Segoe UI Symbol font. As of Windows 8.1 Preview, the Segoe UI Emoji font is included, which supplies full-color pictographs. The plain Segoe UI font lacks emoji characters, whereas Segoe UI Symbol and Segoe UI Emoji include them. Emoji characters are accessed through the onscreen keyboard's  key, or through the physical keyboard shortcut .

Facebook and Twitter replace all Unicode emoji used on their websites with their own custom graphics. Prior to October 2017, Facebook had different sets for the main site and for its Messenger service, where only the former provides complete coverage. Messenger now uses Apple emoji on iOS, and the main Facebook set elsewhere. Facebook reactions are only partially compatible with standard emoji.

Modifiers

Emoji versus text presentation
Unicode defines variation sequences for many of its emoji to indicate their desired presentation.

Specifying the desired presentation is done by following the base emoji with either U+FE0E VARIATION SELECTOR-15 (VS15) for text or U+FE0F VARIATION SELECTOR-16 (VS16) for emoji-style.

Skin color

Five symbol modifier characters were added with Unicode 8.0 to provide a range of skin tones for human emoji. They are based on the Fitzpatrick scale for classifying human skin color. Human emoji that are not followed by one of these five modifiers should be displayed in a generic, non-realistic skin tone, such as bright yellow (■), blue (■), or gray (■). Non-human emoji (like ) are unaffected by the Fitzpatrick modifiers.
, Fitzpatrick modifiers can be used with 131 human emoji spread across seven blocks: Dingbats, Emoticons, Miscellaneous Symbols, Miscellaneous Symbols and Pictographs, Supplemental Symbols and Pictographs, Symbols and Pictographs Extended-A, and Transport and Map Symbols.

The following table shows both the Unicode characters and the open-source "Twemoji" images, designed by Twitter:

Joining

Implementations may use a zero-width joiner (ZWJ) between multiple emoji to make them behave like a single, unique emoji character. Systems that do not support it would ignore the ZWJs, displaying only the three base emoji in order (👨👩👧).

Unicode previously maintained a catalog of emoji ZWJ sequences that were supported on at least one commonly available platform. The consortium has since switched to documenting sequences that are recommended for general interchange (RGI). These are clusters that emoji fonts are expected to include as part of the standard.

The ZWJ has also been used to implement platform specific emojis. For example, in 2016 Microsoft released a series of Ninja Cat emojis for their Windows 10 Anniversary Update. Ninja Cat and variants were removed in late 2021's Fluent emoji redesign.

In Unicode

Unicode  represents emoji using 1,424 characters spread across 24 blocks, of which 26 are Regional indicator symbols that combine in pairs to form flag emoji, and 12 (#, * and 0–9) are base characters for keycap emoji sequences:

637 of the 768 code points in the Miscellaneous Symbols and Pictographs block are considered emoji. 242 of the 256 code points in the Supplemental Symbols and Pictographs block are considered emoji.  All of the 107 code points in the Symbols and Pictographs Extended-A block are considered emoji.  All of the 80 code points in the Emoticons block are considered emoji. 105 of the 118 code points in the Transport and Map Symbols block are considered emoji. 83 of the 256 code points in the Miscellaneous Symbols block are considered emoji. 33 of the 192 code points in the Dingbats block are considered emoji.

Additional emoji can be found in the following Unicode blocks: Arrows (8 code points considered emoji), Basic Latin (12), CJK Symbols and Punctuation (2), Enclosed Alphanumeric Supplement (41), Enclosed Alphanumerics (1), Enclosed CJK Letters and Months (2), Enclosed Ideographic Supplement (15), General Punctuation (2), Geometric Shapes (8), Geometric Shapes Extended (13), Latin-1 Supplement (2), Letterlike Symbols (2), Mahjong Tiles (1), Miscellaneous Symbols and Arrows (7), Miscellaneous Technical (18), Playing Cards (1), and Supplemental Arrows-B (2).

Additions
Some vendors, most notably Microsoft, Samsung and HTC, add emoji presentation to some other existing Unicode characters or coin their own ZWJ sequences.

Microsoft displays all Mahjong tiles (U+1F000‥2B, not just ) and alternative card suits as emoji. They also support additional pencils and a heart-shaped bullet.

While only  is officially an emoji, Microsoft and Samsung add the other three directions as well.
Both vendors pair the standard checked ballot box emoji  with its crossed variant , but only Samsung also has the empty ballot box .

Samsung almost completely covers the rest of the Miscellaneous Symbols block (U+2600‥FF) as emoji, which includes Chess pieces, game die faces, some traffic sign as well as genealogical and astronomical symbols for instance.

HTC supports most additional pictographs from the Miscellaneous Symbols and Pictographs (U+1F300‥5FF) and Transport and Map Symbols (U+1F680‥FF) blocks. Some of them are also shown as emoji on Samsung devices.

The open source projects Emojidex and Emojitwo are trying to cover all of these extensions established by major vendors.

In popular culture 
 The 2009 film Moon featured a robot named GERTY who communicates using a neutral-toned synthesized voice together with a screen showing emoji representing the corresponding emotional content.
 In 2014, the Library of Congress acquired an emoji version of Herman Melville's Moby Dick created by Fred Benenson.
 A musical called Emojiland premiered at Rockwell Table & Stage in Los Angeles in May 2016, after selected songs were presented at the same venue in 2015.
 In October 2016, the Museum of Modern Art acquired the original collection of emoji distributed by NTT DoCoMo in 1999.
 In November 2016, the first emoji-themed convention, Emojicon, was held in San Francisco.
 In March 2017, the first episode of the fifth season of Samurai Jack featured alien characters who communicate in emoji.
 In April 2017, the Doctor Who episode "Smile" featured nanobots called Vardy, which communicate through robotic avatars that use emoji (without any accompanying speech output) and are sometimes referred to by the time travelers as "Emojibots".
 On July 28, 2017, Sony Pictures Animation released The Emoji Movie, a 3D computer animated movie featuring the voices of Patrick Stewart, Christina Aguilera, Sofía Vergara, Anna Faris, T. J. Miller, and other notable actors and comedians.
 On September 3, 2021, Drake released his sixth studio album, Certified Lover Boy with album cover art featuring twelve emoji of pregnant women in varying clothing colors, hair colors and skin tones.

See also

 Blob emoji
 Emojipedia
 Emojli
 Hieroglyphics
 iConji
 Kaomoji
 Pictogram

Notes

References

Further reading

External links

 Unicode Technical Report #51: Unicode emoji
 The Unicode FAQ – Emoji & Dingbats
 Emoji Symbols – the original proposals for encoding of Emoji symbols as Unicode characters
 Background data for Unicode proposal
 emojitracker – list of most popularly used emoji on the Twitter platform; updated in real-time

 
Computer-related introductions in 1997
Computer icons
Internet culture
Internet slang
Japanese inventions
Japanese writing system terms
Japanese writing system
Online chat
Pictograms